Abeba Birhane is an Ethiopian-born cognitive scientist who works at the intersection of complex adaptive systems, machine learning, algorithmic bias, and critical race studies. Birhane's work with Vinay Prabhu uncovered that large-scale image datasets commonly used to develop AI systems, including ImageNet and 80 Million Tiny Images, carried racist and misogynistic labels and offensive images. She has been recognized by VentureBeat as a top innovator in computer vision.

Early life and education 
Birhane was born in Ethiopia. She received her Bachelors of Science in Psychology and a Bachelors of Arts in Philosophy from The Open University. In 2015, she completed her Master of Science in Cognitive Science and, in 2021, her Ph.D. at the Complex Software Lab in the School of Computer Science at University College Dublin.

Career and research 
Birhane studied the impacts of emerging AI technologies and how they shape individuals and local communities. She found that AI algorithms tend to disproportionately impact vulnerable groups such as older workers, trans people, immigrants, and children. Her research on relational ethics won the best paper award at NeurIPS’s Black in AI workshop in 2019. She has also studied and written about algorithmic colonization. Her work in decolonizing computational sciences addressed the inherited oppressions in current systems especially towards women of color.

In 2020, Birhane and Vinay Prabhu, principal machine learning scientist at UnifyID, published a paper examining the problematic data collection, labelling, classification, and consequences of large image datasets. These datasets, including ImageNet and MIT's 80 Million Tiny Images, have been used to develop thousands of AI algorithms and systems. Birhane and Prabhu found that they contained many racist and misogynistic labels and slurs as well as offensive images. This resulted in MIT voluntarily and formally taking down the 80 Million Tiny Images dataset.

More recently, Birhane has worked with Rediet Abebe, George Obaido, and Sekou Remy on researching the barriers to data sharing in Africa. They found that power imbalances are significant in the data sharing process, even when the data comes from Africa. Their research was published at the ACM Conference on Fairness, Accountability, and Transparency.

Selected awards 

 2019 NeurIPS Black in AI Workshop Best Paper Award
 2020 Venture Beat AI Innovations Award in the category Computer Vision Innovation (received with Vinay Prabhu)
 2021 100 Brilliant Women in AI Ethics Hall of Fame Honoree
 2022 Lero Director’s Prize for PhD/PostDoctoral Contribution.

References 

Living people
Artificial intelligence researchers
Machine learning researchers
20th-century Ethiopian women
Ethiopian women activists
Women computer scientists
Artificial intelligence ethicists
Cognitive scientists
Year of birth missing (living people)